Raphael Silva da Arruda (born 20 April 1992) is a Brazilian professional footballer who plays as a defender. He joined Esteghlal the iranian two time asian champion in 2022 winter as a free agent.

Club career
Born in Cuiabá, Silva started his senior career in 2010 with Rio Preto Esporte Clube, in Paulista A2. On 19 July 2013, he joined Série A club Associação Atlética Ponte Preta. On 25 July, he made his debut for the club in a 1–0 defeat against Nacional Futebol Clube in the Copa do Brasil.

After struggling to get playing time, Silva was loaned out to Boa Esporte Clube on 1 April 2015. On 23 May, he scored his first goal for the club in a 1–1 draw against Paraná Clube. On 13 January 2016, he joined Criciúma Esporte Clube on a two-year contract. On 18 July 2017, he injured himself during a match against Boa Esporte Clube, returning to play three months later in late October.

On 8 January 2018, Silva switched to Goiás Esporte Clube. However, after being rarely used, he terminated his contract with the club on 28 June. Two days later, he moved abroad and signed for Portuguese club Boavista on a three-year contract.

On 30 May 2019, Silva signed Saudi club Al-Faisaly FC on a one-year contract. On 31 January 2022, Silva was released by Al-Faisaly.

Honours

Club
Al-Faisaly
King Cup: 2020–21

Esteghlal
Iran Pro League: 2021–22
Iranian Super Cup: 2022

References

External links

1992 births
Living people
Association football defenders
Brazilian footballers
People from Cuiabá
Campeonato Brasileiro Série A players
Campeonato Brasileiro Série B players
Primeira Liga players
Saudi Professional League players
Rio Preto Esporte Clube players
Associação Atlética Ponte Preta players
Boa Esporte Clube players
Criciúma Esporte Clube players
Goiás Esporte Clube players
Boavista F.C. players
Al-Faisaly FC players
Esteghlal F.C. players
Brazilian expatriate footballers
Brazilian expatriate sportspeople in Portugal
Brazilian expatriate sportspeople in Saudi Arabia
Brazilian expatriate sportspeople in Iran
Expatriate footballers in Portugal
Expatriate footballers in Saudi Arabia
Expatriate footballers in Iran
Sportspeople from Mato Grosso